Chinquapin or chinkapin may refer to:

Plants
 Chinquapin or chinkapin, any of the shrubs in the genus Castanopsis
 Chinquapin or chinkapin, any of the several trees and shrubs in the genus Chrysolepis
 Chinquapin or chinkapin, some of the species in the chestnut genus Castanea 
American chinquapin,  Castanea pumila, a dwarf chestnut native to southeastern quarter of the U.S.
 Chinkapin oak (Quercus muehlenbergii), a species of oak whose leaves resemble those of chinkapins
 Dwarf chinkapin oak (Quercus prinoides), a closely related, more shrubby oak species
 Water-chinquapin, a name for the water plant Nelumbo lutea, American lotus
 Chinquapin rose, a name for Rosa roxburghii, an old Chinese rose

Places 
 Chinquapin, California, a former settlement in Mariposa County, California
 Chinquapin, North Carolina, a community in Duplin County, North Carolina
 Chinquapin, Texas, Matagorda County, Texas

Institutions
 Chinquapin Preparatory School, a school in Highlands, Texas
 Chinquapin Middle School, a school in Baltimore, Maryland

Other uses
, a ship in the US Navy
 Chinquapin Parish, a fictional parish in Louisiana and the setting for the 1987 play Steel Magnolias
 Chinquapin, a name for the redear sunfish (Lepomis microlophus)
 Chinquapin (newsletter), newsletter of the Southern Appalachian Botanical Society

See also
 Chinquapin Grove, former name of Dacula, Georgia
Chinqua Penn Plantation